Klyuchevskaya Sopka (also known as Klyuchevskoi) is a stratovolcano, the highest mountain of Siberia and the highest active volcano of Eurasia. The volcano is part of the natural Volcanoes of Kamchatka UNESCO World Heritage Site.

Klyuchevskaya appeared 7,000 years ago. Its first recorded eruption occurred in 1697, and it has been almost continuously active ever since, as have many of its neighboring volcanoes. It was first climbed in 1788 by Daniel Gauss and two other members of the Billings Expedition. No other ascents were recorded until 1931, when several climbers were killed by flying lava on the descent. As similar dangers still exist today, few ascents are made.

Klyuchevskaya Sopka is considered sacred by some indigenous peoples, being viewed by them as the location at which the world was created. Other volcanoes in the region are seen with similar spiritual significance, but Klyuchevskaya Sopka is the most sacred of these.

Eruptions

Klyuchevskaya volcano has erupted 110 times during the Holocene Epoch.

2007 eruption
Beginning in early January 2007, the Klyuchevskaya volcano began another eruption cycle. Students from the University of Alaska Fairbanks and scientists of the Alaska Volcano Observatory traveled to Kamchatka in the spring to monitor the eruption. On 28 June 2007, the volcano began to experience the largest explosions so far recorded in this eruption cycle. An ash plume from the eruption reached a height of  before drifting eastward, disrupting air traffic from the United States to Asia and causing ashfalls on Alaska's Unimak Island.

2010 eruption

2012 eruptions
On 15 October 2012, the volcano had a weak eruption that stopped the following day. Also a weak thermal eruption occurred on 29 November 2012, then stopped again, as all of its neighboring volcanoes Bezymianny, Karymsky, Kizimen, Shiveluch, and Tolbachik erupted more actively and continuously, taking a major magma supply load off of Klyuchevskaya Sopka.

2013 eruptions
On 25 January 2013, the volcano had a weak Strombolian eruption that stopped the following day. During January 2013, all volcanoes in the eastern part of Kamchatka Bezymianny, Karymsky, Kizimen, Klyuchevskaya Sopka, Shiveluch, and Tolbachik erupted, with the exception of Kamen.

On 15 August 2013, the volcano had another weak Strombolian eruption with some slight lava flow that put on an excellent fireworks display before stopping on 21 August 2013, when Gorely Volcano woke up and started erupting again in relief of Klyuchevskaya Sopka.

On 12 October, Klyuchevskaya had another three days of on-and-off eruptions with anomalies and a short ash plume, possibly indicating Strombolian and weak Vulcanian activity. An explosion from a new cinder cone low on Kliuchevskoi's southwest flank occurred on 12 October. The eruptions weakened and paused by 16 October 2013.

The Aviation Color Code was raised to Red. Later that day, the altitudes of the ash plumes were lower and the eruptions weakened and stopped again.

On 7 December, activity at Kliuchevskoi significantly increased, having continued during 29 November – 7 December, prompting KVERT to raise the Alert Level to Red. According to a news article, a warning to aircraft was issued for the area around the volcanoes. Video showed gas-and-steam activity, and satellite images detected a daily weak thermal anomaly. On 9 December, the Alert Level was lowered to Green when the eruptions abruptly stopped.

2015 eruptions
On 2 January 2015, after a one-year period of inactivity, the volcano had a Strombolian eruption which stopped on 16 January 2015. Minor eruptions resumed on 10 March 2015 and stopped on 24 March 2015. On 27 August 2015, the volcano had another Strombolian eruption which ended 16 hours later.

2019 eruptions
Kluchevskaya Sopka saw renewed eruption activity beginning in 2019. On 25 October 2019, the volcano had another weak Strombolian eruption which ended some 30 hours later.

2020 eruption
A volcanic eruption occurred on 9 December 2020.

2022 eruption
A volcanic eruption started on 20 November 2022.

2022 climbing accidents
In September 2022, nine people died while climbing Kluchevskaya Sopka. They were part of a 12-strong group of Russian nationals, which included two guides. Five climbers were killed after a fall at about 4,000m. Another four, including a guide, died on the mountainside afterwards. A rescue helicopter managed to land at 1,663m at the fourth attempt, bringing rescuers who faced a two-day climb to reach a volcanologists' hut at 3,300m where the three survivors were sheltering.

Images

See also

 List of volcanoes in Russia
 Kronotsky Nature Reserve
 Valley of Geysers
 Kamchatka Peninsula
 Kamchatka Volcanic Eruption Response Team
 List of highest points of Russian federal subjects

References

External links

 Klyuchevskaya Sopka (Climbing). on author's site sgan2009.ru  "Russia begins here" 
 
 Klyuchevskoy Volcano live webcam
  – photos
 Science Daily article on the 2007 eruption's disruption of air traffic

Active volcanoes
Mountains of the Kamchatka Peninsula
Subduction volcanoes
Volcanoes of the Kamchatka Peninsula
Sacred mountains
21st-century volcanic events
Stratovolcanoes of Russia
Four-thousanders of the Kamchatka
Highest points of Russian federal subjects
Holocene stratovolcanoes